Misteryo is a Philippine television horror documentary show broadcast by Q and GMA Network. Hosted by Ryan Eigenmann, it premiered on Q on January 10, 2010. It moved to GMA Network on December 18, 2010. The show concluded on July 9, 2011. It was replaced by Wish Ko Lang! in its timeslot.

The show is streaming online on YouTube.

Ratings
According to AGB Nielsen Philippines' Mega Manila People/Individual television ratings, the final episode of Misteryo scored a 4.7% rating.

References

2010 Philippine television series debuts
2011 Philippine television series endings
Filipino-language television shows
GMA Network original programming
GMA Integrated News and Public Affairs shows
Philippine documentary television series